This is a list of public art on permanent display in Limerick, Ireland. The list applies only to public art accessible in a public space; it does not include artwork in display inside museums. Public art may include sculptures, statues, monuments, memorials, murals and mosaics.

Public art in city centre

People's Park and Pery Square

King's Island

Thomondgate and west city

University of Limerick

Past public art

See also

List of public art in Belfast
List of public art in Cork city
List of public art in Dublin
List of public art in Galway city

References

Bibliography

Monuments and memorials in the Republic of Ireland
Outdoor sculptures in Ireland
Buildings and structures in Limerick (city)
Culture in Limerick (city)
Limerick
Public art